Vercingetorix (– 46 BC) was a Gallic king and chieftain of the Arverni tribe who united the Gauls in a failed revolt against Roman forces during the last phase of Julius Caesar's Gallic Wars. Despite having willingly surrendered to Caesar, he was executed in Rome.

Vercingetorix was the son of Celtillus the Arvernian, leader of the Gallic tribes. Vercingetorix came to power after his formal designation as chieftain of the Arverni at the oppidum Gergovia in 52 BC. He immediately established an alliance with other Gallic tribes, took command, combined all forces and led them in the Celts' most significant revolt against Roman power. He won the Battle of Gergovia against Julius Caesar in which several thousand Romans and their allies were killed and the Roman legions withdrew.

Caesar had been able to exploit Gaulish internal divisions to easily subjugate the country, and Vercingetorix's attempt to unite the Gauls against Roman invasion came too late. At the Battle of Alesia, also in 52 BC, the Romans besieged and defeated his forces; to save as many of his men as possible, he gave himself to the Romans. He was held prisoner for five years. In 46 BC, as part of Caesar's triumph, he was paraded through the streets of Rome and then executed by garroting. Vercingetorix is primarily known through Caesar's  (Commentaries on the Gallic War). To this day, he is considered a folk hero in Auvergne, his native region.

Name 
The Gaulish name Vercingetorix literally means 'great/supreme king/leader of warriors/heroes'. It is a compound of the prefix ver- ('over, superior'; cf. Old Irish for, Old Welsh/Old Breton guor, Cornish gor), attached to -cingeto- ('warrior, hero', from a PIE stem meaning 'tread, step, walk'; cf. Old Irish cinged), and -rix ('king'; cf. Celtiberian reikis, Old Irish rí, Old Welsh ri). Scholar Maigréad Ní C. Dobbs has proposed to see an Irish cognate of the name in the form Ferchinged an rí. In his Life of Caesar, Plutarch renders the name as Vergentorix (Ουεργεντοριξ). According to Florus, he was "endowed [...] with a name which seemed to be intended to inspire terror".

History

Context

Having been appointed governor of the Roman province of Gallia Narbonensis (modern Provence) in 58 BC, Julius Caesar proceeded to conquer the Gallic tribes beyond over the next few years, maintaining control through a careful divide and rule strategy. He made use of the factionalism among the Gallic elites, favouring certain noblemen over others with political support and Roman luxuries such as wine. Attempts at revolt, such as that of Ambiorix in 54 BC, had secured only local support, but Vercingetorix, whose father, Celtillus, had been put to death by his own countrymen for seeking to rule all of Gaul, managed to unify the Gallic tribes against the Romans and adopted more current styles of warfare.

Averni Nobleman
The revolt that Vercingetorix came to lead began in early 52 BC while Caesar was raising troops in Cisalpine Gaul. Believing that Caesar would be distracted by the turmoil in Rome following the death of Publius Clodius Pulcher, the Carnutes, under Cotuatus and Conetodunus, made the first move, slaughtering the Romans who had settled in their territory.

Vercingetorix, a young nobleman of the Arvernian city of Gergovia, roused his dependents to join the revolt, but he and his followers were expelled by Vercingetorix's uncle Gobanitio and the rest of the nobles because they thought that opposing Caesar was too great a risk. Undeterred, Vercingetorix raised an army of the poor, took Gergovia, and was hailed as king.

Tribal alliances

He made alliances with other tribes, and in doing so he united Gaul under the pretense of escaping Roman rule. After having been unanimously given supreme command of their armies, he imposed his authority through harsh discipline and the taking of hostages. Leadership and unification on this level was unprecedented in Gaul and would not happen again for decades.

He adopted a policy of retreating to natural fortifications, and undertook an early example of a scorched earth strategy by burning towns to prevent the Roman legions from living off the land.
Vercingetorix scorched much of the land marching north with his army from Gergovia in an attempt to deprive Caesar of the resources and safe haven of the towns and villages along Caesar's march south.

Siege of Avaricum
However, the capital of the Bituriges, Avaricum (near modern-day Bourges), a Gallic settlement directly in Caesar's path, was spared. Due to the town's strong protests, naturally defensible terrain, and apparently strong man-made reinforcing defenses, Vercingetorix decided against razing and burning it. Leaving the town to its fate, Vercingetorix camped well outside of Avaricum and focused on conducting harassing engagements of the advancing Roman units led by Caesar and his chief lieutenant Titus Labienus. Upon reaching Avaricum, however, the Romans laid siege and eventually captured the capital.

Afterwards, in a reprisal for 25 days of hunger and of laboring over the siegeworks required to breach Avaricum's defenses, the Romans slaughtered nearly the entire population, some 40,000 people, leaving only about 800 alive.

Battle of Gergovia

The next major battle was at Gergovia, capital city of the Arverni. During the battle, Vercingetorix and his warriors crushed Caesar's legions and allies, inflicting heavy losses. Vercingetorix then decided to follow Caesar but suffered heavy losses (as did the Romans and their allies) during a cavalry battle and he retreated and moved to another stronghold, Alesia.

Battle of Alesia 
In the Battle of Alesia in September 52 BC, Caesar built a fortification around the city to besiege it. However, Vercingetorix had summoned his Gallic allies to attack the besieging Romans. These forces included an army of Arverni led by Vercingetorix's cousin Vercassivellaunos and an army of 10,000 Lemovices led by Sedullos.

With the Roman circumvallation surrounded by the rest of Gaul, Caesar built another outward-facing fortification (a contravallation) against the expected relief armies, resulting in a doughnut-shaped fortification. The Gallic relief came in insufficient numbers: estimates range from 80,000 to 250,000 soldiers. Vercingetorix, the tactical leader, was cut off from them on the inside, and without his guidance the attacks were initially unsuccessful. However, the attacks did reveal a weak point in the fortifications and the combined forces on the inside and the outside almost made a breakthrough. Only when Caesar personally led the last reserves into battle did he finally manage to prevail. This was a decisive battle in the creation of the Roman Empire.

According to Plutarch, Caes. 27.8-10, Vercingetorix surrendered in a dramatic fashion, riding his beautifully adorned horse out of Alesia and around Caesar's camp before dismounting in front of Caesar, stripping himself of his armor and sitting down at his opponent's feet, where he remained motionless until he was taken away. Caesar provides a first-hand contradiction of this account, De Bell. Gal. 7.89, describing Vercingetorix's surrender much more modestly.

Imprisonment and death

Vercingetorix was imprisoned in the Tullianum in Rome for almost six years before being publicly displayed in the first of Caesar's four triumphs in 46 BC. He was ceremonially strangled at the Temple of Jupiter Optimus Maximus after the triumph. A plaque in the Tullianum indicates that he was beheaded in 49 BC.

Legacy

Memorials 

Napoleon III erected a  Vercingétorix monument in 1865, created by the sculptor Aimé Millet, on the supposed site of Alesia. The architect for the memorial was Eugène Viollet-le-Duc. The statue still stands. The inscription on the base, written by Viollet-le-Duc, which copied the famous statement of Julius Caesar, reads (in French):

Many other monumental statues of Vercingetorix were erected in France during the 19th century, including one by Frédéric Bartholdi on the Place de Jaude in Clermont-Ferrand.

Asteroid 
Asteroid 52963 Vercingetorix, discovered by the OCA–DLR Asteroid Survey, was named in his honor. The official naming citation was published by the Minor Planet Center on 25 September 2018.

See also 

 Ambiorix
 Alaric I
 Asterix
 Ardaric
 Arminius
 Autaritus
 Battle of Baduhenna Wood
 Bato (Daesitiate chieftain)
 Boudica
 Caratacus
 Fritigern
 Gainas
 Gaius Julius Civilis
 John of Gothia
 Spartacus
 Totila
 Tribigild
 Viriathus

References

Primary sources 
 Julius Caesar, Commentarii de Bello Gallico Book 7
 Dio Cassius, Roman History 40:33–41, 43:19
 Plutarch, Life of Caesar 25–27

Bibliography

External links 

 A reconstructed portrait of Vercingetorix, based on historical sources, in a contemporary style.
 Curchin, Leonard A. Lingua Gallica (The Gaulish Language). Retrieved January 23, 2010 from Uwaterloo.ca
 , Vercingétorix : le politique, le stratège. Paris : Perrin, 2000, 260 p. .

 
80s BC births
46 BC deaths
1st-century BC executions
1st-century BC rulers in Europe
Barbarian people of the Gallic Wars
Celtic warriors
Gaulish rulers
People executed by strangulation
People executed by the Roman Republic
Year of birth unknown
Executed monarchs